Noah Rubin may refer to:

Noah Rubin (music executive)
Noah Rubin (tennis)